= Baherie cattle =

Breed of cattle

The Baherie cattle is a breed of cattle found on the coast of the Massawa region in eastern Eritrea. They have been called Bahari, meaning cattle from the sea/ocean, or Berbera, meaning cattle from Somalia or Aden of Yemen. These alternative names suggest recent origins of the cattle from the Arabian Peninsula or Somalia. They are in the Somali Shorthorned zebu subgroup. They are small with short horns; coat color varies from fawn to reddish brown. They are used for their milk and their meat.
